Cairo West AB  is a military airport on the western side of Cairo, Egypt. The air base shares some infrastructure with the adjacent Sphinx International Airport.

Originally a Royal Air Force installation ("Landing Ground 224"), among other units No. 96 Squadron RAF operated from the base. No. 104 Squadron RAF flew Vickers Wellington bombers against retreating Axis forces from the base after the Battle of El Alamein. The last RAF presence is listed by rafweb.org as No. 620 Squadron RAF's stay from March to June 1946.

After submission of the Fiscal Year 1981 budget, the United States Secretary of Defense/JCS - ordered "Proud Phantom," at a request to Egypt which was an unprogrammed tactical deployment, not part of the regular exercise program. Twelve F-4E Phantom IIs and at least 400 personnel were dispatched from the 347th Tactical Fighter Wing at Moody Air Force Base, Georgia, to Cairo West, in July 1980.

On 29 May 1981 a Lockheed C-130 Hercules crashed after takeoff from the base. 

For a long period it has been frequently listed by aviation periodicals as the home of the 222nd Tactical Fighter Brigade of the Egyptian Air Force, flying McDonnell Douglas F-4 Phantom IIs. 

It has been a frequent site for United States Air Force deployments, with the 487th Air Expeditionary Wing located here in March-May 2003 during the 2003 invasion of Iraq. 

The Cairo West TACAN (Ident: BLA) is located on the field.

See also
Transport in Egypt
List of airports in Egypt

References

External links
 OurAirports – Cairo West AB
 Cairo West AB
 

Airports in Egypt
Egyptian_Air_Force_bases